In geometry, the dodecagonal prism is the tenth in an infinite set of prisms, formed by square sides and two regular dodecagon caps.

If faces are all regular, it is a uniform polyhedron.

Use 

It is used in the construction of two prismatic uniform honeycombs: 

The new British one pound (£1) coin, which entered circulation in March 2017, is shaped like a dodecagonal prism.

Related polyhedra

References

External links
 

Prismatoid polyhedra
Zonohedra